Choi In-Jeong (Hangul: 최인정; ; born 21 May 1990) is a South Korean right-handed épée fencer, three-time team Asian champion, two-time individual Asian champion, three-time Olympian, and two-time team Olympic silver medalist.

Choi competed in the 2012 London Olympic Games, the 2016 Rio de Janeiro Olympic Games, and the 2020 Tokyo Olympic Games. 

Choi began fencing in junior high and made her international debut in 2011, at the World Cup event in Nanjing.

Medal Record

Olympic Games

World Championship

Asian Championship

Grand Prix

World Cup

References

1990 births
Living people
Fencers from Seoul
South Korean female fencers
South Korean épée fencers
Fencers at the 2012 Summer Olympics
Fencers at the 2016 Summer Olympics
Olympic fencers of South Korea
Olympic silver medalists for South Korea
Olympic medalists in fencing
Medalists at the 2012 Summer Olympics
Fencers at the 2014 Asian Games
Fencers at the 2018 Asian Games
Asian Games silver medalists for South Korea
Asian Games bronze medalists for South Korea
Asian Games medalists in fencing
Medalists at the 2014 Asian Games
Medalists at the 2018 Asian Games
Universiade medalists in fencing
Universiade silver medalists for South Korea
Medalists at the 2013 Summer Universiade
Fencers at the 2020 Summer Olympics
Medalists at the 2020 Summer Olympics
20th-century South Korean women
21st-century South Korean women
World Fencing Championships medalists